Adel Emam (born 17 May 1940 is an Egyptian film, television, and stage actor. He is primarily a comedian, but he has starred in more serious works and, combined comedy with romance especially in his earlier films, which included My Wife, the Director General, My Wife's Dignity and My Wife's Goblin with Salah Zulfikar and Shadia.

Emam earned a bachelor's degree in Agriculture from Cairo University. Since then he has appeared in over 103 movies and 10 plays. He is one of the most famous actors in Egypt and the in the Arab world.

His contributions to the stage and film industries through addressing social and political issues in film and television earned him a cult following and a worldwide reputation that made him one of the most influential Arab public figures in the 1980s and 1990s. Adel Imam is considered by a huge mass of cult followers as a cultural icon in the history of modern Egypt.

In January 2000, the United Nations appointed Emam as a Goodwill Ambassador for UNHCR.

Career

Emam launched his career in theater in Ana w Howa w Heya (1962) with Fouad El-Mohandes and Shwikar and in cinema he acted in My Wife, the Director General (1966), My Wife's Dignity (1967), and My Wife's Goblin (1968) with leading actors Salah Zulfikar and Shadia. In early 1970s, he co-starred in Virgo (1970) with Salah Zulfikar, and shared the lead in Find a scandal (1973) with Mervat Amin and Samir Sabry. Later, he started to act in starring roles in the 1980s and 1990s including The Suspect (1981), and Love in a Jail Cell (1983), both films alongside Soad Hosny.

He was an important national figure in Egypt largely because of the Egyptian political roles he took on in many of his films and plays, he always focused on Egypt's politics and religious problems. These roles, whether he intended it or not, often put him in a critical position vis-à-vis the president  or the government, such as The Terrorist (1994) alongside Salah Zulfikar in Zulfikar's final film role. He has been cast several times by the producer Emad Adeeb in movies like  Morgan Ahmed Morgan (2007), and Hassan and Marcus (2008) starring Omar Sharif.

In 2005, he starred in The Embassy in the Building, playing a Cairene everyman inconvenienced when the Embassy of Israel moves into his apartment building. In the following year, Emam was one of the ensemble cast of The Yacoubian Building, a film reputed to be the highest-budgeted in Egyptian cinema and adapted from the novel of the same name. The story is a sharp look at contemporary Egyptian life through the prism of a faded downtown Cairo apartment building.  Emam portrays an aging roué whose misadventures form a central strand of the film's complex narrative.

Personal life
Adel Emam married to a woman named Hala El-Shalaqani and has three children: the director Rami Imam, Sarah Emam, and Mohamed Emam, who also starred in the movie The Yacoubian Building as Taha ElShazli. He's the brother of Esam Imam and Iman Imam. His brother-in-law was actor Mustafa Metwalli.

Adel Emam stated on a talk show hosted by Hala Sarhan that Amin Shalaby and the late Younes Shalaby as well as Saeed Saleh were his best friends since university.

In February 2012, Emam was sentenced (in absentia) to three months in jail for offending Islam. Imam said he would appeal the sentence. On September 12, 2012, Emam won his appeal when a Cairo misdemeanours court cleared him of defaming Islam in his films.

Awards 

Adel Emam received numerous awards through his five decades career. He won "Horus" Award twice for his leading roles in Omaret Yakobean and Al-irhabi at Cairo International Film Festival. He won the Honorary Award of the Festival at 2014 Marrakech International Film Festival. He won International Jury Award at São Paulo International Film Festival. In 2005 and 2008 Dubai International Film Festival awarded Adel Emam the Lifetime Achievement Award. He received the first Career Achievement Award in El-Gouna Film Festival in 2017.

Honours

: Commander of the Order of Merit (Egypt)
:  Knight (Achir) of the National Order of Merit (Algeria)
: Commander of the National Order of the Cedar
: Commander of the Order of Ouissam Alaouite
: Grand Officier of the National Order of Merit of Tunisia

Selected works

See also 
 Salah Zulfikar filmography
 List of Egyptian films of the 1970s
 List of Egyptian films of the 1980s

References

External links
 
 All Adel Imam films online in English, Arabic and French

Egyptian comedians
Egyptian male film actors
1940 births
Living people
United Nations High Commissioner for Refugees Goodwill Ambassadors
Egyptian male television actors
Cairo University alumni
People from Mansoura, Egypt
Egyptian male stage actors
20th-century Egyptian male actors
Famous Studios series and characters
Egyptian nationalists
Male comedians
21st-century Egyptian male actors
Egyptian Muslims